On three occasions in New York history, some members of the United States House of Representatives were elected statewide at-large. This was due to an increase of the number of representatives after the previous federal census, and the failure of the State Legislature to re-apportion the congressional districts in time for the next election.

In 1872 and 1882, one representative each was elected for the ensuing term. The Legislature then re-apportioned the congressional districts before the elections in 1874 and 1884.

From 1933 to 1945, two representatives elected at-large sat in the House because the Legislature could not agree on a re-apportionment of the districts. For the election to the 79th United States Congress, which was held in 1944, the congressional districts were finally re-apportioned.

List of members representing the district

1873–1875: One seat 
New York gained one seat following the 1870 Census.

1883–1885: One seat 
New York gained one seat following the 1880 Census.

1933–1945: Two seats 
New York gained two seats following the 1930 Census.

References

 Congressional Biographical Directory of the United States 1774–present

At-large
Former congressional districts of the United States
At-large United States congressional districts
Constituencies established in 1873
Constituencies disestablished in 1875
1873 establishments in New York (state)
1875 disestablishments in New York (state)
Constituencies established in 1883
Constituencies disestablished in 1885
1883 establishments in New York (state)
1885 disestablishments in New York (state)
Constituencies established in 1933
Constituencies disestablished in 1945
1933 establishments in New York (state)
1945 disestablishments in New York (state)